Romeo and Juliet in Sarajevo was an international documentary about the deaths of Admira Ismić (born May 13, 1968) and Boško Brkić (Cyrillic: Бошко Бркић; born August 11, 1968).  The couple were natives of Bosnia and Herzegovina living in the city of Sarajevo.  She was a Bosniak, and he a Bosnian Serb.  They were killed by sniper fire on 19 May 1993, while trying to cross the Vrbanja bridge to the Serb-controlled territory of Grbavica.  Mark H. Milstein's photograph of their dead bodies were used by numerous media outlets, and a Reuters dispatch about them was filed by Kurt Schork.  The documentary was co-produced by PBS's Frontline, the Canadian Broadcasting Corporation, the National Film Board of Canada and WDR Germany.  It was directed by John Zaritsky.

Synopsis
The 1992–96 Siege of Sarajevo by the Bosnian Serb Army (VRS), caused living conditions to deteriorate drastically for its inhabitants and, in 1993, the couple decided to flee the city. Having friends on all sides involved in the conflict, there was a general thought that their passage through the city and its infamous Sniper Alley, under constant fire from hills occupied by the Serbs, could be a safe one. An arrangement was made for 19 May 1993 at 17:00 CEST (GMT +02:00) that no one would fire as the couple approached. According to Dino Kapin, who was a Commander of a Croatian unit allied at the time with Bosnian Army forces, around 17:00 hours, a man and a woman were seen approaching the bridge. As soon as they were at the foot of the bridge, a shot was heard, and according to all sides involved in their passage, the bullet hit Boško Brkić and killed him instantly. Another shot was heard and the woman screamed, fell down wounded, but was not killed. She crawled over to her boyfriend,  embraced him, hugged him, and died. It was observed that she was alive for at least 15 minutes after the shooting.

Mark H. Milstein, the American photojournalist who made the haunting image of Admira and Boško which gave birth to Kurt Schork's article, recalled in an interview that "the morning of May 19, 1993 had been pretty much a bust" for him as far as making photos were concerned: "Excessive Bosnian Army bureaucracy had kept us away from the front line. After lunch, I hooked up with Japanese freelance TV cameraman and a Washington Times journalist. Together, we cruised the city looking for something different. Everywhere we went in Sarajevo ended in frustration. Before calling it a day, however, we decided to check out the front-line around the Vrbanja Bridge. There was a small battle going on, with Bosnian forces firing at a group of Serb soldiers near the ruins of the Union Invest building. Suddenly, a Serb tank appeared 200 meters in front of us, and fired over our heads. We scrambled to the next apartment house, and found ourselves holed up with a group of Bosnian soldiers. One of the soldiers yelled at me to look out the window, pointing at a young girl and boy running on the far side of the bridge. I grabbed my camera, but it was too late. The boy and girl were shot down. Bosniak Admira Ismić and Bosnian Serb Boško Brkić, both 25. Their bodies remained in the no man's land for nearly four days before being recovered. I made two frames and afterwards, not knowing who they were or recognizing the significance of the event, returned to the Holiday Inn (where most journalists were headquartered) to develop my film. Later that night I told Kurt Schork what I had seen, and together with his translator began piecing together the information that would eventually result in the news story."

Michael Hedges, the Washington Times reporter who was with Milstein that day, said "A Bosnian soldier motioned for me to look down and to the left, by the bridge. The couple lay together. It appeared they had been shot some time earlier, but I couldn't say whether it was minutes or hours earlier. I went back to the Holiday Inn and wrote an article that was published the next day in the Washington Times. That story, which began with an account of the deaths at the bridge, made it clear we had no idea which side had done the killing, that we only had the Bosnian soldiers' word that it was Serb snipers. That evening, Kurt Schork came to my room, said he had seen Milstein's photos, and asked what I had seen. I showed him a copy of my article, and confirmed the location of the killings. The next day, he developed much more of the story, and through his work it became a symbol of the senseless violence as well as a tale that captured people's imagination."

To this date, it is not known with certainty who fired the shots. The bodies of Admira and Boško lay on the bridge for days since no one dared to enter the Sniper Alley, a no man's land, and recover them. As the bodies lay on the bridge, the Serbs and Bosnian armies argued over who killed the couple and who would ultimately take the responsibility for the killing. After eight days, the bodies were recovered by Serb forces in the middle of the night. However, it was later revealed that the VRS forced Bosnian POWs to go there in the middle of the night and recover the bodies. The two are now buried together, side by side in Lion Cemetery, surrounded by thousands of other victims from the siege of Sarajevo.

Awards
For this film, director Zaritsky received the Alfred Dupont Award from the Columbia University Graduate School of Journalism as well as an Emmy Award nomination.

See also 
 Bill Madden – Bosko and Admira, from the 2008 album Child of the Same God
Kurt Schork - The original dispatch by Kurt Schork, whose ashes are interred next to Bosko and Admira, telling the moving story of Romeo and Juliet in Sarajevo.
 Inela Nogić – Miss Sarajevo 1993
 Jill Sobule – "Vrbana Bridge"
 Vedran Smailović – known as the "Cellist of Sarajevo"
 "薩拉熱窩的羅密歐與茱麗葉", exact translation in Cantonese of "Romeo and Juliet in Sarajevo", from Cantonese singer Sammi Cheng's 1994 album Ten Commandments

References

External links
 
NFB Web page
Mark H. Milstein's image on Flickr with notes about making the world-famous photo of Boško and Admira
Mark H. Milstein's images with notes about making the world-famous photo of Boško and Admira
Article includes mention of Mark H. Milstein, photojournalist who made the famous photos of Boško and Admira
Article includes mention of Mark H. Milstein, photojournalist who made the famous photos of Boško and Admira
PBS Transcript "Romeo and Juliet of Sarajevo"
The Journal for MultiMedia History
 CNN Mission: Peace "Bodies of Sarajevo's 'Romeo and Juliet' come home"
Kurt Schork’s signature dispatch from siege of Sarajevo

1994 films
English-language Canadian films
Reuters
Canadian documentary films
National Film Board of Canada documentaries
Documentary films about war
Documentary films about the Siege of Sarajevo
Films directed by John Zaritsky
Bosnian War films
Frontline (American TV program)
1990s English-language films
1990s Canadian films